The Great Melbourne Telescope was built by the Grubb Telescope Company in Dublin, Ireland in 1868, and installed at the Melbourne Observatory in Melbourne, Australia in 1869. In 1945 that Observatory closed and the telescope was sold and moved to the Mount Stromlo Observatory near Canberra. It was rebuilt in the late 1950s. In 2003 the telescope, still in use as an observatory, was severely damaged in a bushfire. About 70% of the components were salvageable; a project to restore the telescope to working condition started in 2013.

With a 48 inch (1.2 metre) diameter primary mirror, it was one of the largest telescopes of the late 19th century. This is a significant size even into the 21st century, although the lower reflecting ability of speculum metal mirrors (about 2/3 reflected) makes them inferior to later metal-on-glass designs or large refractors. This was significantly larger than the largest refractors of the period such as the Lick telescope and Yerkes, although those were both in the northern hemisphere (they would view the northern skies as opposed to the southern)

Specifications 
The telescope had a  speculum primary mirror, and was mounted on an equatorial mounting, enabling it to track the stars accurately as they appeared to move across the sky. The design had been approved by a committee of leading British astronomers and scientists.
At the time of commissioning it was the second largest telescope operating in the world, after Lord Rosse's 6 foot reflector at Birr, Ireland, and it was the largest fully steerable telescope in the world.

The telescope was designed to explore the nebulae visible from the southern hemisphere, and in particular to document whether any changes had occurred in the nebulae since they were charted by John Herschel in the 1830s at the Cape of Good Hope.

History 

The Great Melbourne Telescope was built by Thomas Grubb in Dublin, Ireland in 1868, and installed at the Melbourne Observatory in Melbourne, Australia in 1869.

After some initial teething problems, the telescope was used for about 20 years at Melbourne Observatory, and one volume of observations produced, along with spectroscopic observations and some pioneering attempts at photographing nebulae. The telescope was upgraded with the addition of photographic equipment in 1872,
but the difficulties of repolishing the mirror and the telescope's relative unsuitability for astrophotography deterred further use.

When Melbourne Observatory closed in 1945, the Great Melbourne Telescope was sold to the Australian Government's Mount Stromlo Observatory near Canberra. It was rebuilt in the late 1950s with modern drive and a new  pyrex mirror. In the early 1990s the telescope, still utilising Grubb's original equatorial mounting, was rebuilt with two charge-coupled device (CCD) arrays to detect MACHOs (massive astrophysical compact halo objects).  This made it Australia's first professional robotic and computerized digital imaging telescope.

Destruction 

In January 2003 an extreme bushfire destroyed the telescopes and buildings at Mount Stromlo - the temperatures were so high that the aluminium dome itself caught fire and melted onto the telescope, shattering the mirror.
The fire-ravaged remnants of the telescope were transferred to Museum Victoria, which had previously acquired discarded parts of the original telescope in 1984.

Restoration project 

After the fire about 70% of the Great Melbourne Telescope's components remained in reusable condition.
A project was set up to restore it to working order and bring its optical, mechanical and electrical systems into line with current best practice, so that it may be used for educational and public viewing in its original home at the Melbourne Observatory. This is a joint undertaking of Museum Victoria, the Astronomical Society of Victoria and the Melbourne Royal Botanic Gardens.
As of 2021 restoration work was continuing. The Victorian government committed $600,000 for the first stage of the restoration, and private benefactors also provided financial support. In November 2019, the main structure of the telescope was reassembled for the first time in 74 years.

Timeline

See also
List of largest optical telescopes of the 19th century
List of telescopes of Australia

Notes

References

External links

 
 
 

1869 establishments in Australia
Buildings and structures completed in 1869
Demolished buildings and structures in Australia